Melissa Jasmine Skye "Milly" Zero (born 7 June 1999) is an English actress.  She has portrayed Hannah on the CBBC children's sitcom All at Sea (2013–2015) and Dotty Cotton in the BBC soap opera EastEnders (2019–2022).

Filmography

Awards and nominations

References

External links
 

1999 births
Living people
English television actresses
English film actresses
English soap opera actresses
People educated at the BRIT School
Actresses from London